John Edgar Chenoweth (August 17, 1897 – January 2, 1986) was a Republican politician from the U.S. state of Colorado, serving as a member of the United States House of Representatives and as a state judge.

Early life
Chenoweth's parents were Thomas Beaseman Chenoweth and Esther Rebecca Chenoweth (née Shamberger). Chenoweth was born in Trinidad, Colorado, and attended the University of Colorado at Boulder. From 1916–1925, he worked on railroads and as a trader. In 1925, he was admitted to the bar and began to practice as a lawyer.

Career
From 1929-33, he served as assistant district attorney; following this, he worked as a county judge for Las Animas County, serving until 1941. In 1940, he was elected as a Republican to the U.S. House, and he was re-elected three times, serving until he was defeated in the 1948 election.

In 1950, however, he won back his old seat, and served there until he was again defeated in the 1964 elections. After this, he returned to Trinidad, Colorado, and once again took up law. He lived there until his death. Chenoweth voted in favor of the Civil Rights Acts of 1957, 1960, and 1964, as well as the 24th Amendment to the U.S. Constitution.

Personal life
He married Ruth Olivia Crews on December 25, 1919. The couple had five children: William Beaseman Chenoweth, Wanda Elizabeth Chenoweth, John Edgar Chenoweth, James Richard Chenoweth, and Ruth Anne Chenoweth.

References

External links

1897 births
1986 deaths
Colorado lawyers
Colorado state court judges
Republican Party members of the United States House of Representatives from Colorado
People from Trinidad, Colorado
20th-century American judges
20th-century American politicians
20th-century American lawyers